This is a list of flute players, organized alphabetically by the musical genre in which they are best known, and whose notability is established by reliable sources in other Wikipedia articles.

In the final section below, any appropriate External links should satisfy roughly the same criteria as this list, and should not be individual homepages, discussion groups, or social media sites.

Western Classical

Richard Adeney
Egidius Aerts
Robert Aitken
Wellington E. Alves
William Alwyn
John Amadio
Neville Amadio
Joachim Andersen
Claudi Arimany
Andrew Ashe
Nina Assimakopoulos
Johann Jacob Bach
Julius Baker
John Barcellona
Samuel Baron
Huáscar Barradas
Georges Barrère
Francesco Barsanti
Jeanne Baxtresser
Larry Beauregard
Michel Bellavance
William Bennett
Atarah Ben-Tovim
Henri Besozzi
Sharon Bezaly
Lisa Beznosiuk
Boris Bizjak
Frances Blaisdell
Andreas Blau
Michel Blavet
Vilém Blodek
Theobald Boehm – also inventor of predecessor of modern flute
François Borne
Denis Bouriakov
Adrian Brett
Giulio Briccialdi
Carlos Bruneel
Katherine Bryan
Ferdinand Büchner
Pierre-Gabriel Buffardin
Marisa Canales
Roland Cardon – alias Guy Rodenhof
Robert Cavally
Frédéric Chalon
Claire Chase
Laura Chislett
Jasmine Choi
Cesare Ciardi
Ian Clarke
Valerie Coleman
Albert Cooper – also flute maker and inventor of Cooper scale
David Davies
Michel Debost
Leonardo De Lorenzo
Jules Demersseman
Abbie de Quant
François Devienne
Franz Doppler
Karl Doppler
Béla Drahos
Mathieu Dufour
Friedrich Dülon
Paul Lustig Dunkel
Hilary du Pré
Elena Duran
Mario Duschenes
Doriot Anthony Dwyer
Alfred John Ellory
Timothy Essex
Pedro Eustache
Bülent Evcil
Andrew Findon
Thierry Fischer
Louis Fleury
Dieter Flury
John Fonville
Frederick the Great – Prussian king and avid amateur
John Frohling
Anton Bernhard Fürstenau
Kaspar Fürstenau
Moritz Fürstenau
Patrick Gallois
James Galway
Bianca Garcia
Giuseppe Gariboldi
Anna Garzuly
Philippe Gaubert
Severino Gazzelloni
Paul Génin
Jean-Claude Gérard
Tula Giannini
Richard Giese
Geoffrey Gilbert
Iwona Glinka
Friedrich Hartmann Graf
Peter-Lukas Graf
Irena Grafenauer
Uwe Grodd
Ørnulf Gulbransen
Nicholas Gunn
Ute Günther
Viviana Guzmán
Rházes Hernández-López
Gudrun Hinze
Katherine Hoover
Jacques-Martin Hotteterre
Luigi Hugues
Timothy Hutchins
Christopher Hyde-Smith
Gerald Jackson
Sébastian Jacot
André Jaunet
Jens Josef
Catherine Ransom Karoly
Dirk Keetbaas
Bettine Keyßer
Jeffrey Khaner
William Kincaid
Kristiyan Koev
Ernesto Köhler
Jadwiga Kotnowska
John C. Krell
Frederich Kuhlau
Barthold Kuijken
Kaspar Kummer
Michel de la Barre
Eric Lamb
Robert Langevin
Sidney Lanier
Maxence Larrieu
Nicholas Laucella
John Lemmone
Hans-Martin Linde
Nicola Lindsay
Diana López Moyal
Donato Lovreglio
Kathryn Lukas
Antoine Mahaut
Alain Marion
Jaime Martín
Marya Martin
Nicholas McGegan
Lorna McGhee
Demarre McGill
Gareth McLearnon
Victor McMahon
Susan Milan
Ulla Miilmann
Claude Monteux
Barbara Morgan – educator and former astronaut
Tadashi Mori
Gareth Morris
Louis Moyse
Marcel Moyse
Ulrich Müller-Doppler
Milan Munclinger
Reza Najfar
Ingrid Søfteland Neset
Charles Nicholson
Aurèle Nicolet
Thomas Nyfenger
Emmanuel Pahud
Eleonore Pameijer
Kathinka Pasveer
Maggi Payne
Philippe Rebille Philbert
Marina Piccinini
James Poke
Claire Polin
Ardal Powell
Stephen Preston
Johann Joachim Quantz – instructor of Frederick the Great, and author of important treatise
Jean-Pierre Rampal
Joseph Rampal
Kurt Redel
Jean Rémusat
Gwyn Roberts
Paula Robison
Mindy Rosenfeld
Elizabeth Rowe
Jane Rutter
Gro Sandvik
Federico Maria Sardelli
Adolf Scherbaum
Gary Schocker
Karl-Heinz Schütz
John Scott
Johann Sedlatzek
Elaine Shaffer
Felix Skowronek
Fenwick Smith
Harvey Sollberger
Ashley Solomon
John Solum
Mark Sparks
Fritz Spiegl
Christian Sprenger
Simion Stanciu
Sanja Stijačić
Alexa Still
Mimi Stillman
Jiří Stivín
James Strauss
Lamar Stringfield
Leoš Svárovský
Paul Taffanel
Paul Taub
Mark Thomas
Rudolf Tillmetz
Albert Tipton
Manfred Trojahn
Johann George Tromlitz
Vladimir Tsybin
Jean-Louis Tulou
Owen Underhill
Pierre-André Valade
Joaquín Valverde Durán
Henk van der Vliet
David Van Vactor
Peter Verhoyen
Linda Vogt
Adam Walker
Jim Walker
Robert Hugh Willoughby
Meredith Willson
Ransom Wilson
Carol Wincenc
Johann Georg Wunderlich
Charles Wyatt
Trevor Wye
Robert Wykes
Carl Zerrahn
Matthias Ziegler
Karlheinz Zöller
Jacques Zoon
Eugenia Zukerman
Ariel Zuckermann

Indian

Devendra Murdeshwar
Mayavaram Saraswathi Ammal
K. Bhaskaran
Sikkil Mala Chandrasekar
Debopriya Chatterjee
Hariprasad Chaurasia
Rakesh Chaurasia
Milind Date
Pannalal Ghosh
Keshav Ginde
Pravin Godkhindi
Steve Gorn
Nityanand Haldipur
Kudamaloor Janardanan
Chetan Joshi
Naveen Kumar
T. R. "Mali" Mahalingam
Ronu Majumdar
Pandit Niranjan Prasad
Raghunath Prasanna
Rajendra Prasanna
Rishab Prasanna
Raghavendran Rajasekaran
H. Ramachandra Shastry
Natesan Ramani
Thiagarajan Ramani
Vijay Raghav Rao
G. S. Sachdev
Palladam Sanjiva Rao
T. S. Sankaran
Tiruchy L. Saravanan
Dipak Sarma
Sarabha Sastri
Raghunath Seth
B. Shankar Rao
Sikkil Sisters – Kunjumani & Neela
Prapancham Sitaram
T. N. Sivakumar
Shashank Subramanyam
Tanjore Viswanathan
Ma Anand Yashu
Bapu Padmanabha

Irish

Harry Bradley
Vincent Broderick
Paddy Carty
Catherine Coleman – astronaut
Kevin Crawford
Eddie Duffy
Packie Duignan
Brian Dunning
Séamus Egan
Brian Finnegan
Michael Flatley
Steph Geremia
Carmel Gunning
Peter Horan
Frankie Kennedy
Joanie Madden
Josie McDermott
Michael McGoldrick
John McKenna
Matt Molloy
Conal Ó Gráda
Peadar O'Loughlin
Marcas Ó Murchú
Francis O'Neill
Mike Rafferty
Micho Russell
Seamus Tansey
Michael Tubridy

Japanese

Christopher Yohmei Blasdel
Watazumi Doso
Robin Hartshorne
Yoshikazu Iwamoto
Phil Nyokai James
Kaoru Kakizakai
Masayuki Koga
Ron Korb – also other world flutes
Kinko Kurosawa
Ken LaCosse
Riley Lee
Kōhachiro Miyata
John Kaizan Neptune
Kokū Nishimura
Atsuya Okuda
Alcvin Ramos
Rodrigo Rodriguez
James Nyoraku Schlefer
Ronnie Nyogetsu Reishin Seldin
Gorō Yamaguchi
Hōzan Yamamoto
Katsuya Yokoyama
Masakazu Yoshizawa

Native American

Bryan Akipa
Michael Graham Allen
Timothy Archambault
Jeff Ball
Odell Borg
Robert Tree Cody
Brent Michael Davids
Joseph Fire Crow
Mark Holland
Al Jewer
Nicole LaRoche
Hawk Littlejohn
Charles Littleleaf
Kevin Locke
Tom Mauchahty-Ware
Bill Miller
Robert Mirabal
Michael Murphy
R. Carlos Nakai
Sonny Nevaquaya
Jay Red Eagle
Douglas Spotted Eagle
Barry Stramp
Gentle Thunder
Andrew Vasquez
Tommy Wildcat
Mary Youngblood

Other traditional / Folk

Altamiro Carrilho – Brazilian
Joaquim da Silva – Brazilian
Bora Dugić – Serbian
Avraham Eilam-Amzallag – Israeli
Gilbert Favre – Bolivian
Julie Fowlis – Scottish
Hassan Kassai – Persian
Liu Qichao – Chinese
Efraín Loyola – Cuban
Fănică Luca – Romanian
Yacouba Moumouni – Nigerian
Chris Norman – Scottish
Hossein Omoumi – Persian
Hemapala Perera – Sri Lankan
Lou Pérez – Cuban
Pixinguinha – Brazilian
Niyazi Sayın – Turkish
Omar Faruk Tekbilek – Turkish
Neyzen Tevfik – Turkish
Henry Thomas – American
Otha Turner – American
Uiliami Leilua Vi – Tongan
Gheorghe Zamfir – Romanian

Jazz / New Age

George Adams
Marshall Allen
Curtis Amy
Ashleigh Ball
Phillip Bent
Sean Bergin
T. K. Blue
Andrea Brachfeld
Jane Bunnett
Don Burrows
Wayman Carver
Danilo Caymmi
Eugenio Colombo
John Coltrane
Charles Compo
Hector Costita
Charles Davis
Jean Derome
Robert Dick
Marco Di Meco
Eric Dixon
Fostina Dixon
Lyn Dobson
Eric Dolphy
Bob Downes
Damian Drăghici
Matt Eakle
Marty Ehrlich
Kat Epple
Joe Farrell
Sherry Finzer
Sonny Fortune
Peter Guidi
Guttorm Guttormsen
Vincent Herring
Paul Horn
Bobbi Humphrey
Fred Jackson Jr.
Bobby Jaspar
Simon Jensen
Tom Keenlyside
Stefan Keller
Wouter Kellerman
Rahsaan Roland Kirk
Moe Koffman
Joe Kučera
Brian Landrus
Prince Lasha
Yusef Lateef
Hubert Laws
Geoff Leigh
Björn J:son Lindh
Charles Lloyd
"Magic" Malik Mezzadri
Herbie Mann
Bill McBirnie
Harold McNair
Lloyd McNeill
Chris Michell
Bobby Militello
Nicole Mitchell
James Moody
Ras Moshe
Sam Most
Charlie Munro
David "Fathead" Newman
James Newton
Andy Panayi
Eddie Parker
Greg Pattillo – beatboxing while playing the flute
Finn Peters
Jaime Prats
Raja Ram
Nelson Rangell
Niki Reiser
Jerome Richardson
Sam Rivers
Ali Ryerson
Pharoah Sanders
Clifford Scott
Bud Shank
Sahib Shihab
Ronald Snijders
Alberto Socarras
Les Spann
James Spaulding
Jeremy Steig
Nicola Stilo
John Stubblefield
Rowland Sutherland
Lew Tabackin
Joe Thomas
Frank Tiberi
Fred Tompkins
Néstor Torres
Theo Travis
Norris Turney
Dave Valentin
Harold Vick
Miho Wada
Jim Walker
Carlos Ward
Frank Wess
Steve Wilson
Leo Wright
Ma Anand Yashu
Alexander Zonjic

Rock / Pop

Ian Anderson – Jethro Tull
India Arie
Kofi Burbridge – Tedeschi Trucks Band
Barry Burns – Mogwai
Mel Collins – King Crimson
Burton Cummings – The Guess Who
Charles DeChant – Hall & Oates
Jerry Eubanks – Marshall Tucker Band
Peter Gabriel – Genesis
John Hackett
Tee Mac Iseli
David Jackson – Van der Graaf Generator
Sevan Kirder – Eluveitie
Andrew Latimer – Camel
Lizzo
Rozalind MacPhail
Ian McDonald – King Crimson
Teddy Osei – Osibisa
Walter Parazaider – Chicago
Florian Schneider – Kraftwerk
Ray Thomas – The Moody Blues
Thijs van Leer – Focus
Tim Weisberg – jazz, rock, fusion
Ann Wilson – Heart
Chris Wood – Traffic

External links 

 MostlyWind's Links to Famous Flute Players

 
Flautists